Peng was a vassal state of the Western Zhou dynasty during the Spring and Autumn period, located at present-day Shanxi Province.

References 

Article Translated by Google Translator.

Zhou dynasty
Ancient Chinese states